Grand-Place is the central square of Brussels, Belgium.

Grand-Place, Grand'Place or Grand Place may refer to:

 Grand-Place (Tournai), the central square of Tournai, Belgium
 Grand'Place, a shopping mall in Grenoble
 Grand Place, Haiti, a village in Haiti
 Grand Place, Reunion, a village in La Réunion
 Grand'Place, the largest square of Arras, France